Peter Kerr (born 26 March 1954) is a former  Australian rules footballer who played with South Melbourne in the Victorian Football League (VFL).

Notes

External links 

Living people
1954 births
Australian rules footballers from Victoria (Australia)
Sydney Swans players